William Andrew Wynne (March 27, 1869 – August 7, 1951) was a professional baseball pitcher. He played one game in Major League Baseball for the Washington Senators of the National League.

Wynne went to school at Wake Forest University and began his professional career with the Columbia Senators in the South Atlantic League in 1892. On August 31, 1894, Wynne started the second game of a doubleheader against the Philadelphia Phillies. He pitched a complete game, allowing eight earned runs. After his brief MLB career, he played in the minors until 1895.

External links

Major League Baseball pitchers
Washington Senators (1891–1899) players
Columbia Senators players
Charleston Seagulls players
Lynchburg Hill Climbers players
Petersburg Farmers players
Wilkes-Barre Coal Barons players
Brockton Shoemakers players
Atlanta Crackers players
Norfolk Clams players
Norfolk Crows players
Baseball players from North Carolina
19th-century baseball players
1869 births
1951 deaths